The 7th Rivers State House of Assembly was formed after the 2011 parliamentary election. The Assembly sat from 30 May 2011 until 31 May 2015. Representatives of the Assembly were elected from 32 constituencies with members of the Rivers State People's Democratic Party in the majority. The Speaker of the Assembly was Otelemaba Amachree while the Clerk of the House was Emmanuel Amaewhule Ogele.

In July 2014, members loyal to Governor Chibuike Amaechi numbering 25, announced their defection to the All Progressives Congress (APC).

Members

References

Rivers State House of Assembly
2011 establishments in Nigeria
2010s establishments in Rivers State
2015 disestablishments in Nigeria
2010s disestablishments in Rivers State